George Benjamin Daniels (born May 13, 1953) is a Senior United States district judge of the United States District Court for the Southern District of New York.

Background and education
Daniels was born in Allendale, South Carolina. He graduated from Suffield Academy in 1971, and received a Bachelor of Arts degree from Yale University in 1975. He received a Juris Doctor from the UC Berkeley School of Law in 1978.

Professional career
Daniels was as a criminal defense attorney for the Legal Aid Society of New York City from 1978 to 1980. Afterwards, he was a law clerk for Chief Justice Rose Bird of the California Supreme Court from 1980 to 1981. From 1981 to 1983, he was in private practice with the New York City law firm of Skadden, Arps, Slate, Meagher & Flom. Daniels served as an Assistant United States Attorney for the Eastern District of New York from 1983 to 1989. He was an adjunct professor of law at Brooklyn Law School from 1988 to 1991. In 1989, Daniels was appointed a Judge of the Criminal Court of the City of New York by Mayor Ed Koch. He stepped down from the bench in 1990 to serve as Counsel to Mayor David Dinkins, but was re-appointed a Judge of the Criminal Court by Dinkins in 1993. He was elected a justice of the Supreme Court of the State of New York in 1995 and served on that until his appointment to the federal bench.

Federal judicial service

Daniels was nominated by President Bill Clinton on August 5, 1999, to a seat on the United States District Court for the Southern District of New York, vacated by Robert P. Patterson, Jr. He was confirmed by the United States Senate on February 24, 2000, by a 98–0 vote. He received his commission on March 9, 2000. Daniels assumed senior status on May 1, 2021.

Notable cases
On June 18, 2010, Daniels outlined the contours of the in pari delicto doctrine in New York, holding in SEC v. Lee, 720 F. Supp. 2d 305, that: To successfully apply the doctrine, the plaintiff must be an active, voluntary participant in the wrongful conduct, and the plaintiff's wrongdoing must be at least substantially equal to that of the defendant.... Furthermore, under New York law, the doctrine of in pari delicto may be subject to the "adverse interest" exception, which applies when an agent is defrauding the principal exclusively for the agent's own benefit and to the detriment of the corporation.... Another exception to the in pari delicto defense is the "innocent insider" exception, which provides that if there is another agent within the corporation who had no knowledge of the fraud, and who had the will and the ability to stop the fraud had it come to his or her attention, the in pari delicto defense will fail...

On March 9, 2016, Daniels issued a default judgment against Iran, ordering it to pay $7.5 billion in damages to families of victims who died in the September 11, 2001 attacks, as well as $3 billion to insurers such as Chubb Limited that paid out claims resulting from the event. The plaintiffs in the case argued that Iran "provided material support" and training to al Qaeda members, including 9/11 hijackers, through Hezbollah prior to the attacks and was therefore liable. Earlier in 2015, Daniels had ruled that Saudi Arabia had sovereign immunity and dismissed all charges against the kingdom for its alleged role in the attacks.

On December 21, 2017, Daniels granted the Government's motion to dismiss CREW v. Trump. On September 13, 2019, the United States Court of Appeals for the Second Circuit vacated and remanded Judge Daniels's decision. The lawsuit challenges President of the United States Donald J. Trump's business activities under the Domestic and Foreign Emoluments Clauses of the United States Constitution, which bar the president from taking gifts or payments from foreign governments.

See also 
 List of African-American federal judges
 List of African-American jurists

References

External links
 Court room contact information

1953 births
Living people
African-American judges
African-American lawyers
Assistant United States Attorneys
Brooklyn Law School faculty
Judges of the United States District Court for the Southern District of New York
New York Supreme Court Justices
People from Allendale, South Carolina
Skadden, Arps, Slate, Meagher & Flom people
Trial lawyers
United States district court judges appointed by Bill Clinton
UC Berkeley School of Law alumni
University of California, Hastings faculty
Yale University alumni
20th-century American judges
21st-century American judges